Csaba Schmidt (3 May 1979 – 19 March 2023) was a Hungarian chemist and politician, member of the National Assembly (MP) from Fidesz Komárom-Esztergom County Regional List between 2010 and 2014. He was elected mayor of Tatabánya on 3 October 2010.

He was a member of the Committee on Sustainable Development from 14 May 2010 to 5 May 2014 and Committee on Local Government and Regional Development from 23 September 2013 to 5 May 2014.

References

1979 births
2023 deaths
Hungarian chemists
Fidesz politicians
Members of the National Assembly of Hungary (2010–2014)
Mayors of places in Hungary
People from Tatabánya